This is a list of diplomatic missions in Eritrea.  At present, the capital city of Asmara hosts 20 embassies.

Embassies in Asmara

Other posts in Asmara
 (Delegation)

Gallery

Non-resident embassies

 (Riyadh)
 (Addis Ababa)
 (Nairobi)
 (Cairo)
 (Cairo)
 (Cairo)
 (Nairobi)
 (Cairo)
 (Addis Ababa)
 (Addis Ababa)
 (Nairobi)
 (Nairobi)
 (Khartoum)
 (Cairo)
 (Sana'a)
 (Cairo)
 (Nairobi)
 (Cairo)
 (Nairobi)
 (Nairobi)
 (Addis Ababa)
 (Addis Ababa)
 (Cairo)
 (Moscow)
 (Rome)
 (Khartoum)
 (Cairo)
 (Khartoum)
 (Addis Ababa)
 (Dar es Salaam)
 (Riyadh)
 (Riyadh)
 (Cairo)
 (Djibouti city)
 (New Delhi)
 (Riyadh)
 (Muscat)
 (Addis Ababa)
 (Valletta)
 (Cairo)
 (Cairo)
 (Khartoum)
 (Cairo)
 (Khartoum)
 (Cairo)
 (Cairo)
 (Cairo)
 (Cairo)
 (Khartoum)
 (Cairo)
 (Nairobi)
 (Cairo)
 (Addis Ababa)
 (Addis Ababa)
 (New York)
 (Nairobi)
 (Khartoum)
 (Nairobi)
 (Cairo)
 (Stockholm)
 (Khartoum)
 (Cairo)
 (Riyadh)
 (Nairobi)
 (Geneva)
 (Cairo)
 (Khartoum)
 (Addis Ababa)
 (Cairo) 
 (Addis Ababa) 
 (Addis Ababa)

Closed missions

See also

 Foreign relations of Eritrea
 List of diplomatic missions of Eritrea

References

External links
Embassy Finder

Diplomatic missions
Eritrea
Lists of organisations based in Eritrea